Chhachh or Chach (Hindko and ) is a region located between Peshawar and Islamabad at the northern tip of Attock, consisting of an alluvial plain extending from Attock District of Punjab, Pakistan, southwest of Topi and Swabi.

Percolation from the Indus makes the area extremely fertile. The population of the area is primarily Hindko and Pashto speakers.

History 

Chach has been identified as the Chukhsa country of the Taxila copper plate inscription.

The Battle of Chach was fought in 1008 AD between the Ghaznavid army of Sultan Mahmud of Ghazni and the Hindu Shahi army of Anandapala, resulting in the latter's defeat.

Geography
Chach is at the edge of Khyber Pakhtunkhwa-Punjab border. It is 20.4 km from Attock city and 22.9 km from Topi, Khyber Pakhtunkhwa.

Chhachh is a plain which rolls from the Hazara-Gandhara hills south to Kamra, and from east of the River Indus to the broken lands near Lawrencepur.

References
 

Regions of Pakistan